Theclopsis  mycon  is a Neotropical butterfly in the family Lycaenidae. It is found in Mexico, Guatemala, Panama, Colombia and Amazonas.

References

Theclinae
Taxa named by Osbert Salvin